Wadi Khaled is a municipality in the district of Akkar, on the borders of northeastern Lebanon.

In Wadi Khaled, it is hot in summer, cold in winter and humid in all seasons. The altitude of this village is between 370 meters (El Msalabieh) and 700 meters (Hneider). It is 175 km from Beirut and 70 km from Tripoli.

There are 25 villages in Wadi Khaled, with Al-Amayer being the most populous.

The population of Wadi Khaled has long been stateless, particularly due to the residents' non-participation in the 1932 Lebanese population census, despite having inhabited the area for centuries. The majority of the inhabitants of the region obtained Lebanese nationality in 1994, thanks to the decree of naturalization n°5247, however there remain an estimated 1,600 stateless people in this region today. The national youth forum in Wadi Khaled was the first to ask for the naturalization of the inhabitants of the village as well as several solidarity and social movements and supporters.

In July of 2022, fighting emerged between two rival families from neighboring localities. At least one person was killed and several more injured by gunfire. The military then intervened and raided the homes of those involved and arrested several.

References

Populated places in Akkar Governorate
Akkar District